George Green Foster (January 21, 1860 – May 1, 1931) was a Canadian lawyer and politician.

Born in Knowlton, Canada East, the son of Samuel E. Foster and Ellen Green, Foster was educated at Knowlton Academy and McGill University (B.C.L., 1881). He was called to the Quebec bar in 1881 and was created a Queen's Counsel in 1896.  His son George Buchanan Foster was a World War I flying ace.

Foster was the Conservative candidate in Brome in the 1896 federal election but was defeated by Liberal Sydney A. Fisher.

He was summoned to the Senate of Canada in 1917 on the advice of Conservative Prime Minister Sir Robert Borden and served until his death in 1931.

References

External links
 
 

1860 births
1931 deaths
Canadian senators from Quebec
Conservative Party of Canada (1867–1942) candidates for the Canadian House of Commons
Conservative Party of Canada (1867–1942) senators
People from Montérégie
Canadian King's Counsel
Anglophone Quebec people

McGill University Faculty of Law alumni